Uwe Kirchner (born December 31, 1965) is a German former footballer.

External links
Career stats

1965 births
Living people
German footballers
East German footballers
East Germany under-21 international footballers
1. FC Magdeburg players
Dynamo Dresden players
FC Hansa Rostock players
Eisenhüttenstädter FC Stahl players
DDR-Oberliga players
Association football defenders